Skubiszewski may refer to:

 Cezary Skubiszewski (born 1949), Polish-Australian composer
 Jan Skubiszewski (born 1981), Australian producer and musician, son of Cezary
 Krzysztof Skubiszewski (1926–2010), Polish lawyer and politician, former foreign minister
 Viva Skubiszewski (Viva Bianca, born 1983), Australian actress, daughter of Cezary

Polish-language surnames